A spam fritter is a slice of Spam fried in batter. Commonly eaten with chips and mushy peas, spam fritters are served in fish and chip shops and burger bars in the UK. They were first introduced during World War II due to fish being unavailable. Spam fritters were so associated with the war that in 1995 a government memo relating to the commemoration of the 50-year anniversary of the war ending recommended "spam-fritter frying to get into the wartime spirit".

In 2006, the makers of Spam, Hormel Foods, announced the return of the spam fritter in pre-packaged form.

References

External links
 Fish, chips, mushy peas and a Spam fritter 

British cuisine
British pork dishes
Spam dishes
Deep fried foods
Austerity in the United Kingdom (1939–1954)